Kmart realism, also termed "low-rent tragedies", is a form of minimalist literature found in American short fiction that became popular in the 1980s.

Style
 
These short stories "represent and reproduce the disintegration of public life [and] the colonization of private life by consumer capitalism".

Background
The precursors of Kmart realism include the so-called trailer park fiction, Diet-Pepsi minimalism, and hick chic.

Author Tao Lin described Kmart realism as being "at its “height” maybe in the mid to late-80’s. Frederick Barthelme had 20-30 stories published in the New Yorker, Mary Robison also had many stories in the New Yorker, and Gordon Lish was publishing other people’s books and stories as an editor at Alfred A. Knopf  and Esquire around then."

Criticism
A related definition describes the genre as American fiction that is characterized, among other things, by a fascination with consumption venues and brand names. John Gardner, in critical works such as On Moral Fiction, criticized this style using the term "brand-name fiction writers" while Tom Wolfe had similar criticisms as well.

Notable authors
Frederick Barthelme, brother of postmodern novelist Donald Barthelme, is noted for his use of Kmart realism in stories such as "Safeway" (The New Yorker, 1981). In addition, Rachel Page, sister of noted postmodern poet Allen Page, has written works that follow the genre of "dirty realism".

Other writers noted for this style also include Ann Beattie, Raymond Carver, Eric Bogosian, Richard Ford, Bobbie Ann Mason, Mary Robison, Joy Williams, Don DeLillo and Tobias Wolff. Mason, for instance, often writes about working-class characters in rural Kentucky who do their laundry at laundromats, and subject matters that are similar to those favored by the aforementioned writers such as Dairy Queens, grocery stores, and third-rate motels.

List of Kmart realist novels
Mall (Eric Bogosian, 2000)
The Pheasant (Raymond Carver, 1982)
The Quick & the Dead (Joy Williams, 2000)
In Country (Bobbie Ann Mason, 1985)
Where I'm Calling From (Raymond Carver, 1988)
Shiloh and Other Stories (Bobbie Ann Mason, 1982)
Escapes (Joy Williams, 1990)
Pattern Recognition (William Gibson, 2003)
The Savage Girl (Alex Shakar, 2001)
Homo Zapiens (Victor Pelevin, 1999)

In other media
The 2010 film Blue Valentine was described by one critic as "easily located at the intersection of romance film and indie-handheld-camera-Kmart-realism".

The alternative rock band The Spirit of the Beehive is also described as Kmart realism.

See also
Postmodernist literature
Pop culture fiction
New Sincerity
Working class culture
Criticism of capitalism

References

Literary realism
Realism (art movement)
20th-century American literature
21st-century American literature
1980s in literature
1990s in literature
2000s in literature